The women's hammer throw at the 2015 Southeast Asian Games was held at National Stadium, Singapore. The track and field events took place on June 9.

Schedule
All times are (UTC+08:00)

Records 

The following new record were set during this competition.

Results 
Legend
X — Failure
SB — Seasonal Best
PB — Personal Best
GR — Games Record

References

Athletics at the 2015 Southeast Asian Games
Women's sports competitions in Singapore
2015 in women's athletics